Bolla is a genus of spread-winged skippers found from Mexico to South America.

Species
Listed alphabetically.
 Bolla antha Evans, 1953
 Bolla atahuallpai (Lindsey, 1925) – Atahuallpa bolla
 Bolla boliviensis (Bell, 1937) – Bolivian bolla
 Bolla brennus (Godman & Salvin, [1896]) – obscure sooty wing or obscure bolla
 Bolla catharina (Bell, 1937)
 Bolla cupreiceps (Mabille, 1891) – gold-headed bolla, golden-headed bolla
 Bolla cybele Evans, 1953 – Veracruz bolla
 Bolla cyclops (Mabille, 1877) – cyclops bolla
 Bolla cylindus (Godman & Salvin, [1896]) – green bolla
 Bolla dorsolaciniae Steinhauser, 1989
 Bolla eusebius (Plötz, 1884) – spatulate sootywing, mauve bolla
 Bolla evippe (Godman & Salvin, [1896]) – Salvin's bolla
 Bolla fenestra Steinhauser, 1991 – Oaxacan bolla
 Bolla giselus (Mabille, 1883) – variable bolla
 Bolla imbras (Godman & Salvin, [1896]) 
 Bolla mancoi (Lindsey, 1925)
 Bolla morona (Bell, 1940)
 Bolla nigerrima Mabille & Boullet, 1917
 Bolla oiclus (Mabille, 1889) – rounded bolla
 Bolla orsines (Godman & Salvin, [1896]) – Goodman's bolla
 Bolla phylo Mabille, 1903
 Bolla saletas (Godman & Salvin, [1896]) – coppery bolla
 Bolla solitaria Steinhauser, 1991 – solitary bolla
 Bolla sonda Evans, 1953 – Evans' bolla
 Bolla subapicatus (Schaus, 1902) – pine-oak bolla
 Bolla zora Evans, 1953
 Bolla zorilla (Plötz, 1886) – shining bolla

Former species
Bolla clytius (Godman & Salvin, [1897]) - transferred to Clytius clytius (Godman & Salvin, [1897])
Bolla litus (Dyar, 1912) - transferred to Pholisora litus (Dyar, 1912)

References

Carcharodini
Hesperiidae of South America
Hesperiidae genera
Taxa named by Paul Mabille